Lorenzo Iglecias "Larry" DeLeon Guerrero Jr. is a politician from the Northern Mariana Islands who has served as a member of the Northern Mariana Islands House of Representatives. A Republican, he represented the 5th district from 2013 to 2021 and served as Vice Speaker during the 21st Commonwealth Legislature. He lost reelection in 2020.

Early life and education
He is the son of former Governor Lorenzo I. De Leon Guerrero. He graduated from Marianas High School and received an Associates Degree from Pierce Community College in Washington State. He served in the United States Army.

References

Living people
21st-century American politicians
People from Saipan
Republican Party (Northern Mariana Islands) politicians
Members of the Northern Mariana Islands House of Representatives
Pierce College people
United States Army soldiers
Year of birth missing (living people)